The Paratethys sea, Paratethys ocean, Paratethys realm or just Paratethys was a large shallow inland sea that stretched from the region north of the Alps over Central Europe to the Aral Sea in Central Asia. 

Paratethys was peculiar due to its paleogeography: it consisted of a series of deep basins, formed during the Oxfordian stage of the Late Jurassic as an extension of the rift that formed the Central Atlantic Ocean. These basins were connected with each other and the global ocean by narrow and shallow seaways that often limited water exchange and caused widespread long-term anoxia. 

Paratethys was at times reconnected with the Tethys or its successors (the Mediterranean Sea or the Indian Ocean) during the Oligocene and the early and middle Miocene times, but at the onset of the late Miocene epoch, the tectonically trapped sea turned into a megalake from the eastern Alps to what is now Kazakhstan. From the Pliocene epoch onward (after 5  million years ago), Paratethys became progressively shallower. Today's Black Sea, Caspian Sea, Aral Sea, Lake Urmia, Namak Lake and others are remnants of the Paratethys Sea.

Paratethys formed about 34 Ma (million years ago) at the beginning of the Oligocene epoch, when the northern region of the Tethys Ocean (Peri-Tethys) was separated from the Mediterranean region of the Tethys realm due to the formation of the Alps, Carpathians, Dinarides, Taurus and Elburz mountains. 
During the Jurassic and Cretaceous periods, this part of Eurasia was covered by shallow seas that formed the northern margins of the Tethys Ocean. However, because Anatolia, the southern boundary of the Paleo-Tethys, is a part of the original Cimmerian continent, the last remnant of Paleo-Tethys Ocean might be oceanic crust under the Black Sea. The Tethys Ocean formed between Laurasia (Eurasia and North America) and Gondwana (Africa, India, Antarctica, Australia, and South America) when the supercontinent Pangea broke up during the Triassic (200 million years ago).

Name and research
The name Paratethys was first used by Vladimir Laskarev in 1924. Laskarev's definition included only fossils and sedimentary strata from the sea of the Neogene system. This definition was later adjusted also to include the Oligocene series. The existence of a separate water body in these periods was deduced from the fossil fauna, including mollusks, fish and ostracods. In periods in which the Paratethys or parts of it were separated from each other or from other oceans, a separate fauna developed which is found in sedimentary deposits. In this way, the paleogeographical development of the Paratethys can be studied.
Laskerev's description of the Paratethys was anticipated much earlier by Sir Roderick Murchison in chapter 13 of his 1845 book.

One of the key characteristics of the Paratethys realm, that is differentiating it from the Tethys Ocean, is the widespread development of endemic faunas, adapted to fresh and brackish waters like those that still exist in recent waters of the Caspian Sea. This distinctive fauna in which univalves of freshwater origin such as Limnex and Neritinex are associated with forms of Cardiacae and Mytili, common to partially saline or brackish waters, makes the geologic records from Paratethys particularly difficult to correlate with those from other oceans or seas because their faunas evolved separately at times. Stratigraphers of the Paratethys, therefore, have their own sets of stratigraphic stages which are still used as alternatives for the official geologic timescale of the ICS.

Palaeogeographic Evolution
The Paratethys spread over a large area in Central Europe and western Asia. In the west it included in some stages the Molasse basin north of the Alps; the Vienna Basin, the Outer Carpathian Basin, the Pannonian Basin, and further east to the basin of the current Black Sea and the Caspian Sea until the current position of the Aral Sea.

Anoxic Giant 
The boundary between the Eocene and Oligocene epochs was characterized by a big drop of the global (eustatic) sea level and sudden steep cooling of global climates. At the same time the Alpine orogeny, a tectonic phase by which the Alps, Carpathians, Dinarides, Taurus, Elburz and many other mountain chains along the southern rim of Eurasia were formed. The combination of a drop in sea level and tectonic uplift resulted in the partial disconnection of the Tethys and Paratethys domains. Due to poor connectivity with the global ocean, the Paratethys realm became stratified and turned into a giant anoxic sea. 

The western and central Paratethys basins experienced intense tectonic activity and anoxia during the Oligocene and early Miocene and became filled with sediments. Local gypsum and salt evaporitic basins formed in the East Carpathian region during the early Miocene. The Eastern Paratethys basin, holding most of the water of Paratethys, remained anoxic for almost 20 million years (35-15 Ma), and during this time Paratethys acted as an enormous carbon sink trapping organic matter in its sediments. The Paratethys anoxia was "shut down" during the middle Miocene, some 15 million years ago, when a widespread marine transgression, known as the Badeninan Flooding, improved connections with the global ocean and triggered the ventilation of the deep waters of Paratethys.

Short-lived open seas 
After the Badenian Flooding, in the middle Miocene, Paratethys was characterized by open-marine environments. Brackish and lacustrine basins turned into ventilated seas. Rich marine fauna containing sharks (e.g., megalodon), corals, marine mammals, foraminifera and nanoplankton spread throughout Paratethys from the neighbouring Mediterranean region, probably via the Trans-Tethyan Corridor, an ancient sea-strait located in modern Slovenia.

Salt Giants 
The open marine environments of Paratethys were short-lived, and halfway through the middle Miocene, progressive uplift of the central European mountain ranges and a eustatic drop isolated Paratethys from the global ocean triggering a salinity crisis in Central Paratethys.
The "Badenian Salinity Crisis" spanned between 13.8-13.4 Ma
Thick evaporitic beds (salt and gypsum) formed in the Outer Carpathians, Transylvanian and Pannonian basins. 
Salt mines extract this middle Miocene salt in Transylvania: Turda, Ocna Mures, Ocna Sibiului and Praid, in the Eastern and Carpathians: Wieliczka, Bochnia, Cacica,  Slanic Prahova and the Southern Carpathians:  Ocnele Mari, but evaporites are also present in areas west of the Carpathians Maramureș, eastern Slovakia, (Solivar mine near Prešov) and to a lesser extent in the Pannonian depresion in central Hungary.

Megalake 
Some 12 million years ago, slightly before the onset of the late Miocene, the ancient sea transformed into a megalake that covered more than 2.8 million square kilometers, from the eastern Alps to what is now Kazakhstan, and characterized by salinities generally ranging between 12–14%. During its 5-million-year lifetime, the megalake was home to many species found nowhere else, including mollusks and ostracods as well as miniature versions of whales, dolphins, and seals.

After Paratethys 
When parts of the Mediterranean fell dry during the Messinian salinity crisis (about 6 million years ago) there were phases when Paratethys water flowed into the deep Mediterranean basins. During the Pliocene epoch (5.33 to 2.58 million years ago) the former Paratethys was divided into a couple of inland seas that were at times completely separated from each other. An example was the Pannonian Sea, a brackish sea in the Pannonian Basin. Many of these would disappear before the start of the Pleistocene. At present, only the Black Sea, Caspian Sea, and the Aral Sea remain of what was once a vast inland sea.

See also

References

Further reading

External links

Historical oceans
Oligocene Europe
Miocene Europe
Pliocene Europe
History of the Mediterranean
Seas of the Mediterranean Sea